Samuel Tilden Montague (January 12, 1868 – September 13, 1939) was an American Democratic politician who served as a member of the Virginia Senate.

He resigned in 1914 to become postmaster of Portsmouth, Virginia but was selected to fill a vacancy in the seat in 1923 upon the death of his successor, William C. Corbitt.

References

External links

1868 births
1939 deaths
Democratic Party Virginia state senators
Virginia postmasters
Politicians from Portsmouth, Virginia
20th-century American politicians